Aechmea bracteata is a plant species in the genus Aechmea. This species is native to Central America, Mexico, Colombia, and Venezuela; it is also reportedly naturalized in the Bahamas.

Cultivars
 Aechmea 'Tritone'

References

bracteata
Flora of Central America
Flora of Mexico
Flora of Venezuela
Flora of Colombia
Plants described in 1788